A World Wide Name (WWN) or World Wide Identifier (WWID) is a unique identifier used in storage technologies including Fibre Channel, Parallel ATA, Serial ATA, SCSI and Serial Attached SCSI (SAS).

A WWN may be employed in a variety of roles, such as a serial number or for addressability; for example, in Fibre Channel networks, a WWN may be used as a WWNN (World Wide Node Name) to identify an endpoint, or a WWPN (World Wide Port Name) to identify an individual port on a switch. Two WWNs which do not refer to the same thing should always be different even if the two are used in different roles, i.e. a role such as WWPN or WWNN does not define a separate WWN space. The use of burned-in addresses and specification compliance by vendors is relied upon to enforce uniqueness.

Formats
Each WWN is an 8- or 16-byte number, the length and format of which is determined by the most significant four bits, which are referred to as an NAA (Network Address Authority). The remainder of the value is derived from an IEEE OUI (or from Company Id (CID)) and vendor-supplied information. Each format defines a different way to arrange and/or interpret these components. OUIs are used with the U/L and multicast bits zeroed, or sometimes even omitted (and assumed zero), though CID has U/L set to 1.

The WWN formats include:
 "Original" IEEE formats are essentially a two-byte header followed by an embedded EUI-48 address (which contains the OUI). The first 2 bytes are either hex 10:00 or 2x:xx (where the x's are vendor-specified) followed by the 3-byte OUI and 3 bytes for a vendor-specified serial number. Thus, the difference between NAA 1 format and NAA 2 format is merely the presence of either a zero pad or an extra 3 nibbles of vendor information.
 "Registered" IEEE formats dispense with padding and place the OUI immediately after the NAA. The OUI is no longer considered to be part of a EUI-48 address. For NAA 5 format, this leaves 9 contiguous nibbles for a vendor-defined value. This is the same format used by the companion NAA 6 format, the only difference being a 16-byte number space is assumed, rather than an 8-byte number space. This leaves a total of 25 contiguous nibbles for vendor-defined values.
 "Mapped EUI-64" formats manage to fit an EUI-64 address into an 8-byte WWN. Since the NAA is mandatory, and takes up a nibble, this represents a four-bit deficit. These four bits are recouped through the following tricks: First, two bits are stolen from the NAA by allocating NAAs 12, 13, 14, and 15 to all refer to the same format. Second, the remaining two bits are recouped by omitting the U/L and multicast bits from the EUI-64's OUI. When reconstructing the embedded EUI-64 value, the U/L and multicast bits are assumed to have carried zero values.

Presentation
WWN addresses are predominantly represented as colon separated hexadecimal octets, MSB-first, with leading zeros — similar to Ethernet's MAC address. However, there is much variance between vendors.

Example usage 

Linux uses WWN to identify disks by providing symbolic links to the real device entry:
ls -l /dev/disk/by-id/
[…]
lrwxrwxrwx 1 root root  9 Jul  4 22:00 wwn-0x5002e10000000000 -> ../../sr0
lrwxrwxrwx 1 root root  9 Jul  4 22:00 wwn-0x500277a4100c4e21 -> ../../sda
lrwxrwxrwx 1 root root 10 Jul  4 22:00 wwn-0x500277a4100c4e21-part1 -> ../../sda1
lrwxrwxrwx 1 root root 10 Jul  4 22:00 wwn-0x500277a4100c4e21-part2 -> ../../sda2
lrwxrwxrwx 1 root root 10 Jul  4 22:00 wwn-0x500277a4100c4e21-part3 -> ../../sda3
(There are more entries in this directory which are omitted here)

The target names (sr0, sda) might change when new devices are added to the computer (e.g. sda might become sdb) but the WWN will be the same. That is an advantage when the WWNs are used in configuration files and scripts, e.g., .

How to Find WWN Information in Linux 

There are various ways how to find WWN information.

Regardless of HBA type, below commands can be used to find WWN number information.

Method 1  
 # cat /sys/class/fc_host/host*/port_name
 
 0x10000090fa2537d6
 
 0x10000090fa253a29

Method 2 : using syminq command 
If EMC Storage is being used so there is a chance you must have SYMCLI software installed. syminq comes with SYSCLI. syminq is also helpful in getting WWN in easy way.
 [root@server]# syminq hba
 Host Name : server
 HBA Type            : FibreChannel
 HBA Name            : Emulex-LPe11000-E-2
 Vendor              : Emulex Corporation
 Model               : LPe11000-E
 Serial Number       : BT01473025
 Firmware Version    : 2.72A2 (Z3D2.72A2), sli-3
 Driver Version      : 8.2.0.63.3p; HBAAPI(I) v2.1.g, 12-07-07
 Node WWN            : 20000000c9b0513a
 Number of Ports     : 1
 Port WWN            : 10000000c9b0513a
 Port name           : /sys/class/scsi_host/host3
 Port type           : NPort
 Port FCID           : 2764032
 Port speed          : 4gbit
 Supported speed     : 4gbit
 Port state          : Online
 Supported COS       : 00000008
 Supported FC4 types : 0000010000000001000000000000000000000000000000000000000000000000
 Active FC4 types    : 0000010000000001000000000000000000000000000000000000000000000000
 Max frame size      : 2048

Method 3 : using hbacmd command 
It will work if hbanyware package is installed.
 [root@server]# /usr/sbin/hbanyware/hbacmd listHBAs
 Manageable HBA List
 Port WWN   : 10:00:00:00:c9:b0:55:2e
 Node WWN   : 20:00:00:00:c9:b0:55:2e
 Fabric Name: 10:00:50:eb:1a:5f:c7:0c
 Flags      : 8000fe00
 Host Name  : server
 Mfg        : Emulex Corporation
 Serial No. : BT01474056
 Port Number: n/a
 Mode       : Initiator
 Port WWN   : 10:00:00:00:c9:b0:51:32
 Node WWN   : 20:00:00:00:c9:b0:51:32
 Fabric Name: 10:00:50:eb:1a:5f:bd:0c
 Flags      : 8000fe00
 Host Name  : server
 Mfg        : Emulex Corporation
 Serial No. : BT01472998
 Port Number: n/a
 Mode       : Initiator
 [root@server]#

Method 4 : using systool command 
systool utility comes with Linux distros. If it is not available it can be installed on servers where HBA is already installed.
  # systool -c fc_host -v
 (output trimmed for clarity)
   Class Device path = "/sys/class/fc_host/host8"    port_name           = "10:00:00:00:c9:b0:51:32"    node_name           = "20:00:00:00:c9:b0:51:32"

List of OUIs commonly seen as WWN Company Identifiers
OUIs can be queried searching the IEEE organization's Public Manufacturers OUI list. OUIs can also be queried by searching IEEE Standards Registration authority .
 00:10:86 ATTO Technology
 00:60:69 Brocade Communications Systems
 00:05:1E Brocade Communications Systems, acquired with Rhapsody Networks
 00:60:DF Brocade Communications Systems, acquired with CNT Technologies Corporation
 08:00:88 Brocade Communications Systems, acquired with McDATA Corporation. WWIDs begin with 1000.080
 00:05:30 Cisco
 00:05:73 Cisco
 00:05:9B Cisco
 00:0D:31 Dell, Inc., for Dell Compellent Storage products
 00:01:E8 Dell, Inc., for Dell Force10 Networking Products
 00:23:29 DDRdrive LLC, for DDRdrive X1
 00:60:16 EMC Corporation, for CLARiiON/VNX
 00:60:48 EMC Corporation, for Symmetrix DMX
 00:00:97 EMC Corporation, for Symmetrix VMAX
 00:01:44 EMC Corporation, for VPLEX
 00:00:C9 Emulex
 00:60:B0 Hewlett-Packard - Integrity and HP9000 servers. WWIDs begin with 5006.0b0
 00:11:0A Hewlett-Packard - ProLiant servers. Formerly Compaq. WWIDs begin with 5001.10a
 00:01:FE Hewlett-Packard - EVA disk arrays. Formerly Digital Equipment Corporation. WWIDs begin with 5000.1fe1 or 6000.1fe1
 00:17:A4 Hewlett-Packard - MSL tape libraries. Formerly Global Data Services. WWIDs begin with 200x.0017.a4
 00:0C:CA HGST, a Western Digital Company
 00:60:E8 Hitachi
 00:50:76 IBM
 00:17:38 IBM, formerly XIV.
 00:15:17 Intel
 00:A0:98 NetApp
 24:A9:37 Pure Storage
 00:E0:8B QLogic HBAs, original identifier space
 00:1B:32 QLogic HBAs. new identifier space starting to be used in 2007
 00:C0:DD QLogic FC switches
 00:90:66 QLogic formerly Troika Networks
 00:11:75 QLogic formerly PathScale, Inc
 00:25:38 Samsung Electronics, for solid-state drive
 00:1B:44 SanDisk
 00:1E:82 SanDisk
 00:0C:50 Seagate Technology
 00:A0:B8 Symbios Logic
 1C:5A:0B Tegile Systems
 00:00:39 Toshiba
 00:14:EE Western Digital
 14:F0:C5 Xtremio (EMC Corporation)
 00:50:CC Xyratex
 57:42:B0 Infinidat, For infinibox
 00:24:E9 Samsung

See also 
 Advanced Technology Attachment (ATA)
 Fibre Channel
 Persistent binding
 Serial Attached SCSI (SAS)
 Switched fabric
 World Wide Port Name (WWPN)

External links
IEEE OUI list

References 

SCSI
Fibre Channel
Identifiers